The Seminar on the Acquisition of Latin American Library Materials (SALALM) is the oldest professional Area Studies library organization for academic librarians, archivists, book vendors, scholars, and students who specialize in Latin American and Caribbean Studies. Members are from at least 20 different countries. SALALM promotes better library services and purchasing power among individual members and member libraries. With the Secretariat based at Tulane University's Latin American Library, it is an international non-profit professional organization with three official languages: English, Spanish, and Portuguese. SALALM is an affiliate of the American Library Association. As of May 2015, the organization had 242 personal and 84 institutional members including librarians, archivists, book dealers, vendors, and university libraries.

History 
SALALM had its first meeting in 1956 with approximately 30 librarians and professors and one international bookseller met in Florida at Chinsegut Hill in a meeting convened by the Pan-American Union. Their discussions were “concerned with the selection, acquisition, and processing of library materials from the Latin American nations and the dependent territories of the Caribbean.” Although participants thought this meeting would be a one-time occurrence, they agreed there was a need for more study of the challenges with acquisitions and to continue the discussion by meeting for annual seminars held at the invitation of an institution or organization. Each conference has a theme, like the 57th annual conference theme, "Popular Culture: Arts and Social Change in Latin America," and plenary sessions may discuss the theme, present new research or projects related to Latin American Librarianship, or share committee reports.

Since the 1960s, SALALM has published a number of serials and monograph series including a newsletter, conference proceedings, progress reports, and bibliographies. Conference proceedings cover topics like "The Handbook of Latin American Studies: Its Automated History and a Comparison of Available Formats." The archival records of the organization are held at the Benson Latin American Collection at the University of Texas at Austin.

Since 1956, SALALM has provided a unique national and international forum that focuses on library collection development and services related to Latin American resources. SALALM was incorporated as a nonprofit organization in 1968, and the members adopted a constitution and bylaws and elected A. Curtis Wilgus as the first president. An Executive Board administers SALALM from the Secretariat, which is currently at the Latin American Library at Tulane University. The operational aspects are managed by several Executive Board committees. Program committees take care of intellectual and technical activities related to the resources and services of libraries with Latin American collections. The SALALM Secretariat is housed for three to five year periods at institutions that have strong Latin American programs. Hortensia Calvo is the current Executive Secretary.

Locations of past conferences and presidents 
SALALM has held conferences is North and South America, Europe, and the Caribbean. In the table below, Presidents are listed with institutional affiliations, if applicable, at the time of their service during the year the end of their terms.

*Note: 1st SALALM President elected at 13th conference.

Purpose 
SALALM's primary mission revolves around the control and dissemination of bibliographic information about all types of Latin American publications and the development of library collections of Latin Americana in support of educational research. SALALM also promotes cooperative efforts to achieve better library service. SALALM is a forum for the unique challenges of Latin American and Caribbean Studies Librarians and with related professional development. In collaboration with REFORMA, SALALM also provides library materials for the Spanish and Portuguese-speaking populations in the United States. SALALM shares and disseminates the work of its member through an annual conference proceeding.

Awards and scholarships 
SALALM currently sponsors a series of Awards and Scholarships including the SALALM Conference Attendance Scholarship, the Dan C. Hazen SALALM Fellowship, Enlace Travel Awards, the José Toribio Medina Award, and the SALALM Award for Institutional Cooperation. SALALM also awards honorary memberships to retired members who have a long record of service to the organization combined with professional achievements.

Since 1986, SALALM has sponsored the Enlace Travel Awards, which provides funding for librarians and information professionals from Latin American and the Caribbean to attend SALALM's annual meetings. To date, the awards have funded conference attendance opportunities from every Spanish-speaking country in the Americas in addition to Brazil, Guyana, Jamaica, Trinidad and Tobago, and the Basque Country in Spain.

Since 2011, SALALM has provided scholarships to students enrolled in ALA-accredited library and information science programs. Originally a general scholarship, the scholarship now funds attendance at the group's annual conference.

Jose Toribio Medina Award Winners

SALALM Virtual Conference 2020

Tarragó, Rafael E. The Ignored Contender: A Select Annotated Bibliography of the Cuban Autonomist Party (1878-1898). SALALM Secretariat, The Latin American Library, Tulane University, 2017.

2019 LXIIII Austin, Texas

Gayle Ann Williams and Jana Lee Krentz, editors. Latin American Collection Concepts: Essays on Libraries, Collaborations, and New Approaches. Jefferson, North Carolina: McFarland & Company, Inc., Publishers, 2019.

2018 LXIII Mexico City, Mexico

Marisol Ramos, Jennifer Snow & Charles Venator-Santiago. “The Puerto Rican Citizenship Archives Project: A History of the Extension of U.S. Citizenship to Puerto Rico”

2017 LXII, Ann Arbor, MI

Antonio Sotomayor. The Sovereign Colony: Olympic Sport, National Identity, and International Politics in Puerto Rico (Lincoln: University of Nebraska Press, 2016).

2016 LXI, Charlottesville, VA

Sarah A. Buck Kachaluba.

Buck Kachaluba, Sarah A. and Aaron Dziubinskyj, ed. and trans. Eugenia: a fictional sketch of future customs. A Critical Edition. Eduardo Urzáiz Rodríguez. (Madison, Wisconsin: The University of Wisconsin Press, 2016)
2015 LX, Princeton, NJ

Suzanne Schadl.

Schadl, Suzanne M., and Marina Todeschini. “Cite Globally, Analyze Locally: Citation Analysis from a Local Latin American Studies Perspective”. College & Research Libraries (2014): crl13-442.

2014 LIX, Salt Lake City, Utah

Sarah Aponte. Autores dominicanos de la diáspora: apuntes bio-bibliográficos (1902-2012) co-authored with Franklin Gutiérrez. (Santo Domingo, Dominican Republic: Biblioteca Nacional Pedro Henríquez Ureña, 2013)

2012 LVII Port of Spain, Trinidad and Tobago

Molly Molloy. Frontera List for Mexico and Border News. (2009-current)

2009 LIV, Berlin, Germany

Víctor Federico Torres. Diccionario de Autores puertorriqueños contemporáneos (San Juan, P.R.: Editorial Plaza Mayor, 2009)

2007 LII, Albuquerque, NM

Víctor Julián Cid Carmona. Repertorio de impresos mexicanos en la Biblioteca Nacional de España, siglos XVI-XVII (Mexico, D.F.: El Colegio de México, 2004)

2006 LI, Santo Domingo, DR

Richard D. Woods. Autobiographical Writings on Mexico: an annotated bibliography of primary sources (Jefferson, NC: McFarland, 2005)

2005 L, Gainesville, FL

Ana María Cobos. Latin American Studies: an annotated bibliography of core works (Jefferson, NC: McFarland, 2002)

2004 XLIX, Ann Arbor, MI

Tony A. Harvell. Latin American Dramatists since 1945: a bio-bibliographical guide (Westport, CN: Praeger, 2003)

2003 XLVIII, Cartagena, Colombia

Victor Torres. Narradores puertorriqueños del ’70: guía biobibliográfica (San Juan, PR: Editorial Plaza Mayor, 2001)

2002 XLVII, Ithaca, NY

Gayle Williams. Index Guide to Latin American Journals (Austin, TX: SALALM Secretariat, Benson Latin American Collection. The University of Texas at Austin, 1999)

2001 XLVI, Tempe, AZ

Iliana Sonntag Blay. Twentieth Century Poetry from Spanish America: An Index to Spanish Language and Bilingual Anthologies (Lanham, Maryland: Scarecrow Press, 1998)

2000 XLV, Long Beach, CA

Eileen Oliver. Afro-Brazilian Religions: A Selective Bibliography 1990-1997 (Austin, TX.: SALALM Secretariat, Benson Latin American Collection. The University of Texas at Austin, 1998)

1999 XLIV, Nashville, TN

Cecilia Puerto. Latin American Women Artists, Kahlo and Look Who Else: a selective, annotated bibliography (Westport, CN: Greenwood Press, 1996)

1998, XLIII, San Juan, PR

Peter A. Stern. Sendero Luminoso:an annotated bibliography of the Shining Path guerrilla movement, 1980-1993 (Albuquerque, NM: SALALM, 1995)

1997, XLII, Rockville, MD

Barbara Tennenbaum. Encyclopedia of Latin American History and Culture (New York: C Scribner’s Sons, 1996)

1996, XLI, New York

Library of Congress, Hispanic Division. Handbook of Latin American Studies Compact Disk (Austin: University of Texas Press, 1995)

1995, XL, Athens, GA

Nelly Sfeir González. Bibliographic Guide to Gabriel García Márquez, 1986-1992 (Westport, CT: Greenwood Press, 1994)

1994, XXXIX, Salt Lake City

C. Jared Loewenstein. A Descriptive Catalogue of the Jorge Luis Borges Collection in the University of Virginia Library (Charlottesville, VA: University Press of Virginia, 1993)

1993, XXXVIII, Guadalajara

Paula A. Covington. Latin America and the Caribbean: A Critical Guide to Research Sources(New York: Greenwood Press, 1992)

1992, XXXVII, Austin

Robert A. McNeil and Barbara G. Valk. Latin American Studies: A Basic Guide to Sources (2d ed., revised and enlarged; Metuchen, New Jersey and London: Scarecrow Press, 1990)

1991, XXXVI, San Diego

Carole Travis. A Guide to Latin American and Caribbean Census Material: A Bibliography and Union List (London: British Library, 1990)

1990, XXXV, Rio de Janeiro

Martha Davidson. Picture Collections, Mexico: A Guide to Picture Sources in the United Mexican States (Metuchen: Scarecrow Press, 1988)

And

Lionel V. Loroña. A Bibliography of Latin American Bibliographies, 1980-1984: Social Sciences and Humanities (Metuchen: Scarecrow Press, 1987)

1989, XXXIV, Charlottesville

Barbara Valk. Borderline: A Bibliography of the United States-Mexico Borderlands (Los Angeles: UCLA Latin American Center Publications, 1988)

1988, XXXIII, Berkeley

George F. Elmendorf. Nicaraguan National Bibliography, 1800-1978 (Redlands: Latin American Bibliographic Foundation, 1987)

1987, XXXII, Miami

Nelly Sfeir González and Margaret E. Fau. Bibliographic Guide to Gabriel García Márquez, 1979-1985(Westport, Conn.: Greenwood Press, 1986)

1986, XXXI, Berlin

Alma Jordan and Barbara Comissiong. The English-speaking Caribbean: A Bibliography of Bibliographies (Boston: G.K. Hall, 1984)

1985, XXX, Princeton

Werner Guttentag. Bio-bibliografía boliviana(Cochabamba: Los Amigos del Libro, 1975- )

And

Paula Covington. Indexed Journals: a Guide to Latin American Serials (Madison, WI: Seminar on the Acquisition of Latin American Library Materials, Memorial Library, University of Wisconsin-Madison, 1983)

1984, XXIX, Chapel Hill

Robin M. Price. An Annotated Catalogue of Medical Americana in the Library of the Wellcome Institute for the History of Medicine: Books and Printed Documents, 1557-1821, from Latin America and the Caribbean Islands and Manuscripts from the Americas, 1575-1927 (London: The Institute, 1983)

1983, XXVIII, Costa Rica

Dolores Moyano Martin. Handbook of Latin American Studies (Gainesville: University of Florida Press, 1935- )

And

Sara de Mundo Lo. Index to Spanish American Collective Biography (Boston: G.K. Hall, 1981- )

1982, XXVII, Washington, D.C.

Barbara Valk. HAPI, Hispanic American Periodical Index (Los Angeles: UCLA Latin American Center Publications, University of California, 1976- )

Honorary Memberships

Honorary Members and year elected

Felix Reichman, elected 1970*

Arthur Gropp, elected 1972*

Nettie Lee Benson, elected 1977*

Emma Simonson, elected 1977*

Irene Zimmerman, elected 1977*

Marietta Daniels Shepard, elected 1978*

A. Curtis Wilgus, elected 1980*

Alice Ball, elected 1984

Peter de la Garza, elected 1989

Donald F. Wisdom, elected 1991*

Pauline Collins, elected 1997*

Carl Deal, elected 1997

Suzanne Hodgman, elected 1997

Rosa Q. Mesa, elected 1997*

Iliana Sonntag, elected 1997

Laurence Hallewell, elected 1998

Juan Risso, elected 1998

Alma T. Jordan, elected 1999

Dolores M. Martin, elected 1999*

Jane Garner, elected 2005

Laura Gutiérrez-Witt, elected 2005

Peter Johnson, elected 2005

Barbara Valk, elected 2006*

Robert McNeil, elected 2006*

Ann Hartness, elected 2008

Nelly Sfeir González, elected 2009

César Rodríguez, elected 2013

Mark Grover, elected 2014

David Block, elected 2015

Dan Hazen, elected 2015*

Richard Phillips, elected 2015

Scott Van Jacob, elected 2016*

Sonia T.D.G. Silva, elected 2017

Georgette Dorn, elected 2019

Angela Carreño, elected 2020

deceased

Additional information 
As of 2019, SALALM has held 64 annual conferences around the world. The 2020 in-person conference has been postponed because of the COVID-19 crisis but business meetings will be held remotely as scheduled.

SALALM's outreach efforts include an extensive bibliography on Latin American, US Latinx, and Iberian Studies librarianship.

Affinity groups 
SALALM has both regional and topical/working groups that function through member participation but are outside of the SALALM organizational structure.

Regional groups 
 LANE is the Latin American North East Libraries Network. LANE is the oldest of the regional groups and includes participants from academic and research libraries.
 LASER is the Latin American Studies Southeast Region.
 MOLLAS stands for the Midwest Organization of Libraries for Latin American Studies. 
 CALAFIA is the California Cooperative Latin American Collection Development Group which also includes members from Oregon, Washington, and Utah.

Topical/working groups 
 ALZAR: Academic Latina/o Zone of Activism & Research
 DíScoLA: Digital Scholarship in Latin America. DíScoLA was founded in 2015 during a no-host lunch at Princeton University during the SALALM annual conference for three purposes: to explore what digital scholarship means in Latin American Studies, to build skills and share knowledge about projects, tools and methods within the SALALM community, and to raise SALALM's profile in this emergent area.
 HAPI: Hispanic American Periodicals Index. HAPI evolved out of The SALALM Committee on Bibliography.
 LAIPA: Latin American and Indigenous Peoples of the Americas Subject Authority Cooperative Program Funnel
 LAMP: Latin American Materials Project
 LARRP: Latin Americanist Research Resources Project
 Libreros (book vendors)

Similar organizations 
REFORMA is the National Organization to Promote Library & Information Services to Latinos and the Spanish Speaking and is based in Anaheim, CA with 21 chapters. Latin American Studies Association or LASA has over 13,000 members. SALALM members are active in both REFORMA and LASA.

References

External links 
 

Library-related organizations